Fail Safe is a 1964 Cold War thriller film directed by Sidney Lumet, based on the 1962 novel of the same name by Eugene Burdick and Harvey Wheeler. The film follows a crisis caused by a critical error that sends a group of U.S. bombers to destroy Moscow, and the ensuing attempts to stop the bomber group before it can deploy a nuclear first strike. The film features performances by actors Henry Fonda, Dan O'Herlihy, Walter Matthau, Frank Overton, Larry Hagman, Fritz Weaver, Dana Elcar, Dom DeLuise and Sorrell Booke.

In 2000, the novel was adapted again as a televised play starring George Clooney, Richard Dreyfuss and Noah Wyle, and broadcast live in black and white on CBS.

Plot
United States Air Force General Black has been having recurring dreams in which a Spanish matador kills a bull before a cheering crowd. Black flies to Washington, D.C. to attend a conference led by Dr. Groeteschele, a political scientist renowned for his expertise on the politics of nuclear weapons.

Groeteschele is a fervent anti-communist. At a dinner party the evening before, he dismisses the fears that such a war would destroy the human race. To Groeteschele, nuclear war, like any other war, must have a victor and a loser, and the millions who might die in such a war are the price to be paid to end the Soviet threat.

USAF early warning radar indicates that an unidentified aircraft has intruded into U.S. airspace. Shortly after, the intruder is identified as an off-course civilian airliner. However, a computer error causes one U.S. bomber group, Group 6, to erroneously receive apparently valid orders for a nuclear attack on Moscow. Attempts to rescind this order fail because a new Soviet countermeasure jams U.S. radio communications. Colonel Jack Grady, the group's commander, obeys the order, and Group 6 starts flying their "Vindicator" bombers over the Arctic towards Moscow.

The President of the United States attempts to recall the bombers or shoot them down. Groeteschele is called on to advise the President. Though the military — including Black — warns the President that the Soviets will retaliate with everything they have, Groeteschele insists that the Soviets will surrender when Group 6 reaches Moscow. U.S. fighters scramble to intercept the Vindicators but, using their afterburners, they run out of fuel before they can reach Group 6 and plunge into the Arctic waters.

Communications are opened with the Soviet Premier. The jamming ceases, but the crew follows their training, dismissing the counter-orders as a Soviet ruse. General Bogan advises the Soviets on how to trigger the Vindicators' defense missiles. The President struggles to find a solution that will avert a nuclear holocaust. He orders a U.S. nuclear bomber to fly towards New York City to bomb it if necessary, trading the largest American city for the largest Soviet city, despite knowing that the First Lady is there.

The Soviets destroy most of Group 6, but miss both Grady's plane and a second decoy plane, carrying only defensive weapons. The second plane draws Soviet aircraft away from Grady, despite Bogan's desperate pleas to the Soviets, allowing Grady to evade their defenses.

The Soviets, in desperation, fire all their weapons in the path of the remaining Vindicator.  As Grady nears Moscow, the Americans are finally able to reach him via radio. Both the President and Grady's own wife desperately urge him to break off the attack. As Grady wavers, a salvo of Soviet missiles targets his plane. Grady decoys them with the last of his defensive missiles, causing them to detonate far above him, though Grady knows that his crew has received a fatal dose of radiation. Grady dismisses the pleas as a trick.

The President remains in contact with the U.S. ambassador in Moscow until the telephone line abruptly cuts off with a loud squeal. He then orders General Black, whose wife and children live in New York City, to fly over the city and bomb it, using the Empire State Building as ground zero. After obeying, Black kills himself. As he dies, he calls out to his doomed wife telling her that he has at last learned the meaning of his recurring dream: "The Matador, the Matador ... me ... me."

The last moments of the film show images of people in New York going about their daily lives, unaware of the coming disaster, followed by freeze-frames of their faces as the nuclear bomb explodes.

Cast

 Henry Fonda as the President of the United States
 Dan O'Herlihy as Brigadier General Warren A. "Blackie" Black, USAF
 Walter Matthau as Professor Groeteschele
 Frank Overton as General Bogan, USAF
 Fritz Weaver as Colonel Cascio, USAF
 Edward Binns as Colonel Jack Grady, USAF
 Larry Hagman as Buck, the President's interpreter
 William Hansen as Defense Secretary Swenson
 Russell Hardie as General Stark
 Russell Collins as Gordon Knapp
 Sorrell Booke as Congressman Raskob
 Nancy Berg as Ilsa Woolfe
 John Connell as Thomas
 Frank Simpson as Sullivan
 Hildy Parks as Betty Black
 Janet Ward as Helen Grady
 Dom DeLuise as Master Sergeant Collins, USAF
 Dana Elcar as Mr. Foster
 Stewart Germain as Mr. Cascio
 Louise Larabee as Mrs. Cascio
 Frieda Altman as Mrs. Jennie Johnson

Production
The film was shot in black and white, in a dramatic, theatrical style with claustrophobic close-ups, sharp shadows and ponderous silences between several characters. Except for radio background during a scene at an Air Force base in Alaska, there is no original music score (only the electronic sound effects act as the film's main and end title music). With few exceptions, the action takes place largely in the White House underground bunker, the Pentagon war conference room, the SAC war room, and a single bomber cockpit (a "Vindicator bomber"). Shots of normal daily life are seen only after the title opening credits and in the final scene depicting an ordinary New York City day, its residents entirely unsuspecting of their imminent destruction, each scene ending with a freeze-frame shot at the moment of impact.

The character of Groeteschele was inspired, according to Lumet's audio commentary on the film, by military strategist Herman Kahn.

The "Vindicator" bombers (an invention of the novelists) are sometimes represented in the film with stock footage of Convair B-58 Hustlers. Fighters sent to attack the bombers are illustrated by film clips of the Lockheed F-104 Starfighter, Convair F-102 Delta Dagger, Dassault Mirage III and McDonnell F-101 Voodoo. Stock footage was used because the Air Force declined to cooperate in the production, disliking the premise of a lack of control over nuclear strike forces. The scene depicting bombers taking off was stock footage of a single B-58 takeoff edited to look like several bombers taking off in succession. A nightmare quality is imparted to many of the flying sequences by depicting the planes in photographic negative. In several of the negative sequences the "Soviet interceptors" were actually French-built Mirage fighters with Israeli markings.

Reception
When Fail Safe opened in October 1964, it garnered excellent reviews, but its box office performance was poor. Its failure rested with the similarity between it and the nuclear war satire Dr. Strangelove, which had appeared in theaters first, in January 1964. Still, the film later was applauded as a Cold War thriller. The novel sold through to the 1980s and 1990s, and the film was given high marks for retaining the essence of the novel. Over the years, both the novel and the movie were well received for their depiction of a nuclear crisis, despite many critical reviews rejecting the notion that a breakdown in communication could result in the erroneous go-command depicted in the novel and the movie.

Lawsuit
Fail Safe and Dr. Strangelove were both produced in the period after the Cuban Missile Crisis, when people became much more sensitive to the threat of nuclear war. Fail Safe so closely resembled Peter George's novel Red Alert, on which Dr. Strangelove was based, that Dr. Strangelove screenwriter/director Stanley Kubrick and George filed a copyright infringement lawsuit. The case was settled out of court. The result of the settlement was that Columbia Pictures, which had financed and was distributing Dr. Strangelove, also bought Fail Safe, which had been an independently financed production. Kubrick insisted that the studio release his movie first.

See also

 The Bedford Incident, a 1965 film based on a novel about an engagement between an American destroyer and a Soviet submarine in the North Atlantic.
 By Dawn's Early Light, a 1990 TV film based on the novel Trinity's Child by William Prochnau, about an accidental nuclear attack on the US and the subsequent desperate attempts to avoid nuclear annihilation.

References

Notes

Bibliography

 Dolan Edward F. Jr. Hollywood Goes to War. London: Bison Books, 1985. .
 Evans, Alun. Brassey's Guide to War Films. Dulles, Virginia: Potomac Books, 2000. .
 Harwick, Jack and Ed Schnepf. "A Viewer's Guide to Aviation Movies". The Making of the Great Aviation Films, General Aviation Series, Volume 2, 1989.
 LoBrutto, Vincent. Stanley Kubrick: A Biography. New York: Da Capo Press, 1999. .

External links

 
 
 
 
 
 Fail Safe: Very Little Left of the World an essay by Bilge Ebiri at the Criterion Collection

1964 films
1960s thriller films
American political thriller films
Apocalyptic films
American black-and-white films
Cold War aviation films
Columbia Pictures films
Films about fictional presidents of the United States
Films about nuclear war and weapons
Films based on American novels
Films based on military novels
Films based on thriller novels
Films directed by Sidney Lumet
Films set in 1964
Films set in Nebraska
Films set in Washington, D.C.
Films set on airplanes
Films about the United States Air Force
Films about World War III
Films with screenplays by Walter Bernstein
Films set in the Arctic
Films set in Moscow
Films set in New York City
1960s English-language films
1960s American films
Films set in bunkers